Ayamonte is a town and municipality of Spain belonging to the province of Huelva, Andalusia. It is located near the border with Portugal on the mouth of the Guadiana River. According to the 2015 census, the city had a population of 20,357 inhabitants.

History 
In the municipality are located parts of the megalithic site La Torre-La Janera which is assumed to date back to the 5th millennium BC. The town was seized away from Muslim control in 1240 during the reign of Sancho II of Portugal, and it was donated afterwards to the Order of Santiago. Ayamonte became part of the Crown of Castile in 1263.

Fishing and salting of tuna and sardine was already practised in Ayamonte since the Middle Ages. The town suffered due to the War with Portugal and the plague pandemics in the 17th century. In the following century, Catalans and other eastern merchants installed in the town and gave impetus to the local canning and salt industry.

Location
The township of Ayamonte preserves its old medieval quarter in the central district of the town, with many very narrow streets and historical buildings; this central area is a designated car-free zone.

The beach area of Ayamonte is Isla Canela and is reached by a causeway across the Marismas del Guadiana; the marismas (salt marshes) are a wildlife reserve, providing a home to many waterfowl, including herons and flamingos. Isla Canela is built along several kilometers of sandy beaches, and provides an area for windsurfing, kitesurfing and sailing. There are a number of golf courses in and around the area, including one built into the Marismas itself.

Transport 
The ferry link between Ayamonte and Vila Real de Santo António was the traditional crossing point between Spain and Portugal. A modern bridge over the Guadiana River has now been built to the north of the town, linking the motorway systems of both countries, but the ferry still runs and provides an inexpensive mode of transport between the two countries.

Culture 

The city, is also famous for his local festivities, the "Fiestas de las Angustias" in honor of their patron "Nuestra Señora de las Angustias". The festivities in the beginning of September are a moment of celebration not only from the Ayamontin population, but also for many Andalucians, and Portuguese. The festivities are graced by the local band, "Banda Ciudad de Ayamonte" and the Portuguese "Banda da Sociedade Filarmónica Progresso e Labor Samouquense" from the Portuguese village of Samouco.

Climate 
Ayamonte has a Hot-summer Mediterranean climate (Köppen: Csa) with mild, somewhat humid winters and dry, warm to hot summers. Autumn is the wettest season.

Demographics

People 
 Antonio León Ortega (1907–1991), Sculptor. He had his professional education in Madrid and he created a personal style in the Andalusian imagery of the 20th century.
 María Isabel, singer.

References

External links
Ayuntamiento de Ayamonte*** changed to www.ayamonte.es **
Ayamonte - Sistema de Información Multiterritorial de Andalucía

Municipalities in the Province of Huelva
Portugal–Spain border crossings